West Greene High School is a high school in Greene County located at 275 West Greene Drive in Mosheim, Tennessee. It is operated by the Greene County School system.

History
It is a consolidation of Mosheim, McDonald, Glenwood, and Warrensburg schools.
Warrensburg is no longer open.
Mosheim High School was closed when WGHS opened in 1966.
Mosheim High School occupied a larger campus than WGHS but served grades 1-12 with an enrollment around 1000 students.
In 1966 Mosheim High became Mosheim Elementary and continues to serve grades K-8.
In 1973 the large "Old Mosheim High School" building was demolished to make way for a smaller, open classroom elementary school.

Feeder schools
 Glenwood School (closed in 2019)
 Mosheim Elementary
 West Greene Middle (formerly Mosheim Middle)
 McDonald Elementary

Athletics
Students may participate in a variety of athletic programs:

Baseball
Basketball - Boys and Girls
Cross Country - Boys and Girls
Football
Golf - Boys and Girls
Softball
Tennis - Boys and Girls
Volleyball
Wrestling - Boys and Girls
Band
Track and Field
Soccer - Boys and Girls

References

Schools in Greene County, Tennessee
Public high schools in Tennessee
Mosheim, Tennessee